The Kalaza Formation is a geological formation in Xinjiang, China whose strata date back to the Late Jurassic. There is some confusion with the stratigraphy of this unit, as the term is used for sediments of equivalent age in both the Junggar Basin and the Turpan Basin. Dinosaur remains are among the fossils that have been recovered from formation.

Vertebrate paleofauna

See also

 List of dinosaur-bearing rock formations

References

Jurassic System of Asia
Tithonian Stage